Weather Report  is the tenth studio album by the American jazz fusion band Weather Report released in January 1982. The band's first album is also self-titled, causing confusion among consumers and retailers upon its release. It is the final album featuring bass guitarist Jaco Pastorius and drummer Peter Erskine in the rhythm section.

Background 

The album features an increasingly heavy use of synthesized orchestration from Josef Zawinul, who had been becoming even more dominant within the band's sound. Zawinul was by now frequently doubling the basslines on Quadra synthesizer, something which annoyed and alienated Pastorius, who also had reservations about Zawinul's electronic big band sound (and who was himself increasingly working on a side career with a mostly acoustic band).

The vast majority of the album was composed by Zawinul, with the exception of one Wayne Shorter piece and one collectively composed item assembled from a group jam. The center piece of the album is the three part "N.Y.C." The three movement suite starts with 41st Parallel, a bouncing groove showing off Erskine's unique touch on the drums.  The second movement, The Dance, is a more traditional swing feel, but with Zawinul's synthesizer orchestration heavily laid on top. The final movement, Crazy About Jazz, is a cordial ending.

Track listing 

"Volcano for Hire" (Zawinul) – 5:25
"Current Affairs" (Zawinul) – 5:54
"N.Y.C. (41st Parallel/The Dance/Crazy About Jazz)" (Zawinul) – 10:11
"Dara Factor One" (Zawinul) – 5:25
"When It Was Now" (Shorter) – 4:45
"Speechless" (Zawinul) – 5:58
"Dara Factor Two" (Zawinul, Shorter, Pastorius, Erskine, Thomas Jr.) – 4:27

Personnel 

 Josef Zawinul – electric keyboards, piano, synthesized horn/strings/brass/woodwind, clay drum, drum computer, percussion, voice, front cover concept
 Wayne Shorter – tenor and soprano saxophones
 Jaco Pastorius – bass guitar, percussion, vocals
 Peter Erskine – drums, drum computer, claves
 Robert Thomas Jr. – percussion

Technical

 Neil Dorfsman and Mitch Gibson - engineer
 Joseph Futterer and Richie Powell - art direction
 Don Dixon - cover artwork

References

External links 

 Weather Report Annotated Discography: Weather Report (1982)

1982 albums
Columbia Records albums
ARC Records albums
Weather Report albums